The Cao Cao Mausoleum, also known as the Gaoling Mausoleum of Wei and the Xigaoxue Tomb No. 2, is a tomb in Xigaoxue Village, Anfeng Township, Anyang County, Anyang City, Henan Province, China. It is purported to be the burial site of Cao Cao (155–220 CE), a prominent warlord who lived in the late Eastern Han dynasty. The discovery of the tomb was reported on 27 December 2009 by the Henan Provincial Cultural Heritage Bureau. In 2013, the tomb became part of the seventh batch of Major Historical and Cultural Sites Protected at the National Level in China.

Historical background
Cao Cao (155–220 CE) was a warlord and politician who rose to prominence towards the end of the Han dynasty ( 184–220 CE) and became the de facto head of government in China during that period. In 216 CE, he received the title of a vassal king – King of Wei – from Emperor Xian, the figurehead Han emperor whom he controlled. Through his military conquests, he laid the foundation for what was to become the state of Cao Wei (220–266 CE), which was established by his son and successor, Cao Pi. Cao Cao died in 220 CE in Luoyang at the age of 65 and was posthumously honoured as "King Wu" (武王; literally "martial king") by Emperor Xian.

The location of Cao Cao's tomb has been a mystery over the centuries. According to his official biography in the Records of the Three Kingdoms (Sanguozhi), he was interred in the Gaoling (高陵; literally "high mausoleum") about one month after his death. However, he was also believed to be buried elsewhere. Other purported burial sites of Cao Cao include: Xu (許; present-day Xuchang, Henan), the capital of the Han dynasty at the time; beneath the Zhang River; below the Bronze Sparrow Platform, a terrace in Ye (in present-day Handan, Hebei), the capital of Cao Cao's vassal kingdom.

Another legend, which originated in the Northern Song dynasty (960–1127) and was popularised by the works of Luo Guanzhong, Pu Songling and others in later periods, says that Cao Cao had 72 tombs constructed to serve as decoys and protection against grave robbers. The Northern Dynasty Tombs in Ci County, Handan, Hebei were initially believed to be the 72 tombs, but archaeologists later confirmed that they belonged to the imperial families of the Eastern Wei and Northern Qi dynasties and have nothing to do with Cao Cao.

Discovery
The tomb was discovered in December 2008 when workers at a nearby kiln were digging for mud to make bricks. Its discovery was initially not reported. The local authorities found out only after they seized a stone tablet bearing the inscription 'King Wu of Wei' – Cao Cao's posthumous title – from grave robbers who claimed to have stolen it from the tomb. Over the following year, archaeologists recovered more than 250 relics from the tomb, including stone paintings depicting social life in Cao Cao's time, stone tablets bearing inscriptions of sacrificial objects, and several items labelled as "personal belongings" frequently used by Cao Cao, including weapons and stone pillows. The bones of three persons were also unearthed and identified to be those of a man in his 60s, a woman in her 50s and another woman in her 20s.

The tomb, made of bricks, faced east and formed a shape resembling the Chinese character jia when viewed from above. It covered an area of roughly 740 square metres and its deepest point was about 15 metres below the ground. The underground tomb has two main chambers (front and back), four side chambers and connecting passages. An inclined passage 39.5 metres long and 9.8 metres wide leads to the underground chambers.

The discovery of the tomb was confirmed by archaeological officials on 27 December 2009.

Controversy
Since the tomb was discovered, many sceptics and experts have pointed out problems with it and raised doubts about its authenticity. Yuan Jixi, a vice dean of the Renmin University of China's School of Chinese Classics, suggested that the items in the tomb cannot be guaranteed as authentic because the tomb had been greatly disturbed by grave robbers. Yuan also noted that the most important pieces of evidence – namely the artefacts bearing the inscription 'King Wu of Wei' – may have been deliberately placed in the tomb for deceptive purposes.

31 December 2009 seminar
On 31 December 2009, the Henan Provincial Institute of Archaeology invited experts from the Chinese Academy of Social Sciences's Institute of Archaeology, Zhengzhou University, and Henan University to join its researchers in a seminar to discuss the findings from the tomb and respond to queries from the press. The most popular topics discussed at the seminar include:
 Whether the tomb was a decoy (one of the 72 tombs mentioned in legend): The experts said that the legend of the 72 tombs is not reliable as compared to information from historical sources, and that the legend should not be regarded seriously. They cited the case of the Northern Dynasty Tombs in Ci County, Handan, Hebei, which were previously mistakenly believed to be the 72 tombs.
 Whether to believe the tomb robbers or archaeologists: One of the eight stone tablets bearing the inscription 'King Wu of Wei' was retrieved by the authorities from tomb robbers, while the other seven were unearthed directly from the tomb by professionals. The authenticity of the tablets remain in question.
 Whether DNA testing can confirm the identity of the male: According to the experts, the use of ancient DNA technology in archaeological research has yet to be fully developed so there may be technical difficulties. Besides, the male skeleton was not well preserved so the DNA extraction procedure may be very complicated. Even if the technology is fully functional, scientists still require DNA samples from a verified living descendant of Cao Cao to confirm the results. It is very difficult to find a living descendant of Cao Cao and verify that he/she is really a descendant of Cao Cao.
 The identities of the two females: Researchers believe that the older female is Lady Bian, who, according to her historical biography in the Sanguozhi, was buried in the Gaoling (高陵; literally "high mausoleum") – the same place as Cao Cao. The younger one is believed to be a servant. However, it is impossible for older woman remains to be lady Bian as she passed away at the age of 69 in 230AD in her grandson Cao Rui reign.
 Whether the adjacent tomb, called the "Xigaoxue Tomb No. 1", was Cao Cao's tomb: The experts said that the first tomb is unlikely to be Cao Cao's tomb because its dimensions are smaller than the second tomb.

Endorsement by the SACH
In early January 2010, in light of the controversy over the authenticity of the tomb, Han Fuzheng, a lawyer from Cangzhou, made a freedom of information (FOI) request to the State Administration of Cultural Heritage (SACH) for the disclosure of the information and assessment standards used in confirming the tomb. On 28 January, the SACH stated that the procedures associated with the excavation process, archaeological research and verification, publishing of results, etc., were all in accordance with the rules of archaeological work. This statement by the SACH effectively served as a legal endorsement of the results from the research conducted throughout 2009 which suggest that the tomb was Cao Cao's.

August 2010 forum
In August 2010, 23 experts and scholars presented evidence at the National High-Level Forum on Culture of the Three Kingdoms Period held in Suzhou, Jiangsu to argue that the findings and the artefacts of the tomb are fake.

During the forum, Lin Kuicheng, a historian and member of the China Federation of Literary and Art Circles, pointed out that Cao Cao should not be referred to as "King Wu of Wei" before 220 CE. After Cao Cao died in March 220 CE, his vassal king title – "King of Wei" – was inherited by his son, Cao Pi, who continued to hold the title until around December when he forced Emperor Xian, the last emperor of the Han dynasty, to abdicate in his favour. Since Cao Cao was buried about one month after his death and his funeral was most likely presided over by Cao Pi, it would be taboo to refer to Cao Cao as "King Wu of Wei" because the "King of Wei" (Cao Pi) was still living then. Furthermore, when Emperor Xian relinquished his throne to Cao Pi, he referred to Cao Pi and Cao Cao as "King of Wei" and "King Wu" respectively in his official abdication edict; Cao Cao was never referred to as "King Wu of Wei" in the edict.

Cao Huan and Cao Yu
On 12 September 2010, the Henan Provincial Institute of Archaeology and Cultural Heritage and the Anyang County Cultural Centre published an article in the journal Kaogu (Archaeology) about the tomb. In the article, they claimed that the tomb and the adjacent one (the Xigaoxue Tomb No. 1) actually belonged to Cao Huan (the fifth and last Wei emperor) and his father Cao Yu (a son of Cao Cao) respectively. The defining piece of evidence was a seal that was initially thought to be a simple official seal, but was later discovered to be actually a seal bearing the tomb owner's name. When the seal was first revealed after it was excavated from the tomb, it was presented upside-down so the Chinese character inscribed on it in seal script did not make any sense. After the error was corrected, archaeologists recognised that the Chinese character on the seal is huan, hence they deduced that the tomb was Cao Huan's. When compared with the Chinese characters inscribed on a bronze seal belonging to Cao Xiu (whose tomb's discovery was announced and confirmed in May 2010), archaeologists noticed that the Chinese character on the seal from the Xigaoxue tomb bore some slight resemblance to the Chinese character cao. According to the Wei Shipu (魏世譜; Genealogy of Wei), Cao Huan died at the age of 57, which was rather close to the age at which the man in the tomb died.

Fang Beichen, a Sichuan University history professor who specialises in the Three Kingdoms period, published an essay on his personal blog about the findings from the Xigaoxue tomb and the pieces of evidence which point out that the tombs are actually the mausoleums of Cao Huan and Cao Yu.

Current status
In 2010, the tomb became part of the fifth batch of Major Historical and Cultural Sites Protected at the National Level in China.

The excavation of the two tombs was completed by the end of 2010, with over 400 artefacts unearthed and 100 damaged relics restored by the provincial archaeologist team. To enhance the protection of the tomb, the local government in Anyang has established a special committee to oversee and manage the tomb. , the tomb is not open to the public yet even though preparatory works for its opening are underway. The government has also built a temporary exhibition hall and a supporting ring corridor.

, it has been announced that the government is constructing a museum on the original site of the tomb which will be named 'Cao Cao Mausoleum Museum'. On 12 November 2012, a private museum in Zhengzhou donated a stele to the Cao Cao Mausoleum.

Media reports from 2018 describe the tomb complex as having an outer rammed earth foundation, a spirit way, and structures on the east and south sides. Archaeologists have also noted that the tomb's exterior and perimeter appear to be deliberately left unmarked; there are neither structures above the ground around the tomb nor massive piles of debris in the vicinity. This indirectly confirms historical records that Cao Pi had ordered the monuments on the surface to be systematically dismantled to honour his father's wishes to be buried in a simple manner in a concealed location, as well as to prevent tomb robbers from finding and looting the tomb.

Archaeologists also found another tomb next to Cao Cao's that was built around the same time. The other tomb, however, contains only clothes and no human remains were found inside. Experts believe that this tomb belongs to Cao Cao's eldest son, Cao Ang, who was killed at the Battle of Wancheng and his body was never found.

References

 Chen, Shou (3rd century). Records of the Three Kingdoms (Sanguozhi).
 Pei, Songzhi (5th century). Annotations to Records of the Three Kingdoms (Sanguozhi zhu).

Mausoleums in China
Family of Cao Cao
Anyang
Archaeological sites in China
Major National Historical and Cultural Sites in Henan
2008 archaeological discoveries